Euthaliopsis is a monotypic genus erected by Jacob R. H. Neervoort van de Poll in 1896. The single contained species is Euthaliopsis aetion (Hewitson, 1862) which feeds on Calophyllum as a larva.

The subspecies of Euthaliopsis aetion are:
E. a. aetion Aru
E. a. plateni (Staudinger, 1886) Bachan
E. a. thieli (Ribbe, 1898) New Guinea
E. a. rugei (Ribbe, 1898) New Hanover, New Ireland
E. a. donata Fruhstorfer, 1906 Waigeu, Biak, Noemfoor
E. a. philomena Fruhstorfer, 1906 New Guinea
E. a. sosisthenes (Fruhstorfer, 1913) Papua, Woodlark, Yela Island
E. a. mysolensis (Talbot, 1932) Mysol
E. a. halmaherensis Yokochi, 1995 Halmahera

References

Limenitidinae
Butterflies described in 1896